Escape from Crime is a 1942 American crime film directed by D. Ross Lederman. It has essentially the same plot as the earlier Picture Snatcher (1933).

Cast
 Richard Travis as Red O'Hara
 Julie Bishop as Molly O'Hara
 Jackie Gleason as Screwball Evans (as Jackie C. Gleason)
 Frank Wilcox as Cornell
 Rex Williams as Slim Dugan
 Wade Boteler as Lieutenant 'Biff' Malone
 Charles C. Wilson as Reardon (as Charles Wilson)
 Paul Fix as Dude Merrill
 Ruth Ford as Myrt
 John Hamilton as Rafferty
 Ann Corcoran as Belle Mason
 Ben Taggart as Warden Kirby

References

External links
 
 
 
 

1942 films
1942 crime films
American crime films
1940s English-language films
American black-and-white films
Films directed by D. Ross Lederman
1940s American films